"My Love Is Gone" is a song by Australian electronic music group Safia. It was released on 2 September 2016 as the fourth and final single from their forthcoming debut studio album, Internal (2016).

Remixes were released on 2 December 2016.

Critical reception
Robin Murray from Clash described the track as "spaced out R&B vibes arrive drenched in house-like euphoria".

Kate Carnell from Wickedd Childd said that "Kylie Minogue springs to mind" when describing the song.

Track listings
remixes
 "My Love is Gone" (Billon remix) - 5:55
 "My Love is Gone" (Set Mo remix) - 6:52

Music video
The music video for "My Love Is Gone" was released on 16 November 2016.

Charts

References

Safia (band) songs
2016 singles
2016 songs
Parlophone singles